Sumanth Reddy (born 21 April 1978), better known as Vaibhav, is an Indian actor who works primarily in Tamil film industry. He made his debut with the Telugu film Godava (2007) under his father, A. Kodandarami Reddy's direction. He is best known for his performances in Venkat Prabhu films Saroja (2008), Goa (2010), Mankatha (2011),  Chennai 600028 (2016)  and movies such as Kappal (2014), Aambala (2015), Aranmanai 2 (2016) and Meyaadha Maan (2017).

Early life 

Vaibhav Reddy was born in Chennai to Telugu filmmaker A. Kodandarami Reddy. He did his schooling at the Cambridge Matriculation Higher Secondary School, Lloyds Road, Chennai, Tamil Nadu and at St. Bede's Anglo Indian Higher Secondary School in Chennai. His elder brother, Sunil Reddy, made his acting debut with Seethakaathi (2018).

Career 
He made his acting debut in 2007, starring in the Telugu film Godava under his father's direction opposite Shradha Arya, which didn't do well at the box office. Before he made his debut, he was trained at the Asha Chandra School of Acting in Mumbai and also with Sathyanand of Vizag. He next starred in the Tamil comedy-thriller film Saroja. The film, a Venkat Prabhu directorial was a critical as well as commercial success, bringing fame to Vaibhav. He worked with the same team again in another comedy film  Goa that released in early 2010.

His next release was Easan by director M. Sasikumar. He worked for the third time with Venkat Prabhu in Mankatha starring Ajith Kumar alongside Arjun Sarja. The film released generally to positive reviews while marking the second highest-grossing opening for a Tamil film and become big blockbuster. In 2014, he had first solo lead role in Damaal Dumeel  in which he played a typical software industry professional. He has also acted in Anamika, a remake of Bollywood film Kahaani. and Kappal in which he is a small town boy, who moves to the city. He played the role of a stage performer in Meyaadha Maan. His next in a lead role, Sixer directed by debutant Chachi and then RK Nagar was released on 17 December 2019 in Netflix. His two films in 2020 are Taana and Lock Up. In 2021, he starred in web series, Live Telecast with Kajal Aggarwal followed by Malaysia To Amnesia with Vani Bhojan.

Filmography

References

External links
 
 Official Website on IMDB Records

Male actors in Tamil cinema
Living people
Male actors in Telugu cinema
Indian male film actors
Male actors from Chennai
21st-century Indian male actors
1980 births
Telugu male actors